Dame Virginia Ngozi Etiaba  (born 11 November 1942) is a Nigerian politician who served as Governor of Anambra State, a state in South-Eastern Nigeria, from November 2006 to February 2007. Etiaba was the first woman to serve as governor of a Nigerian state.

She was instated as the previous governor, Peter Obi, was impeached by the state legislature for alleged gross misconduct. She transferred her powers back to Obi three months later when an appeal court nullified the impeachment.

Biography
Etiaba is a native of Nnewi in Anambra state. She was raised by her uncle Chief Pius Ejimbe from secondary school in Kano Nigeria,this was followed by her teachers training programme in Gombe State.she married the Late Be innnet Etiaba of Umudim Nnewi.

For 35 years she worked as a teacher and headed several schools in Kafanchan, Aba, Port Harcourt, and Nnewi. She retired from the services of the Anambra State Government in 1991 and founded the Bennet Etiaba Memorial Schools, Nnewi, of which she was the proprietress. In March 2006 she resigned to assume the position of the Deputy Governor of Anambra State.

Personal life 
Etiaba married the late Bennet Etiaba of Umudim Nnewi in 1998.

The two lived happily for 24 years until he died. She has six children. Apart from being the first female governor in Nigeria's history, she is also a cancer survivor. She was diagnosed with colon cancer in Nigeria. It was confirmed at King's College London Hospital, Denmark Hill, South East London in 1998.

References

Living people
Igbo politicians
Governors of Anambra State
Women state governors of Nigeria
People from Nnewi
1942 births
21st-century Nigerian women politicians
21st-century Nigerian politicians
Recipients of the Order of the Niger
Cancer in Nigeria